Juan Mejía may refer to:

 Juan Mejía González (born 1975), Mexican drug lord
 Juan Andrés Mejía (born 1986), Venezuelan politician